Joseph Paul Gleason (July 9, 1895 – September 8, 1990) was a pitcher in Major League Baseball. He pitched in parts of two seasons for the Washington Senators.

Gleason began his professional career with the New Bedford Whalers of the Class C Colonial League in 1914.  After his appearances with the Washington Senators, he played minor league baseball for several more years, ending his career with the Scranton Miners and Elmira Colonels of the New York–Pennsylvania League in 1931.

References

External links

1895 births
1990 deaths
Major League Baseball pitchers
Washington Senators (1901–1960) players
Hagerstown Terriers players
Baseball players from New York (state)
People from Phelps, New York
New Bedford Whalers (baseball) players